David II (Davit' II) also known as Imām Qulī Khān (1678 – November 2, 1722), of the Bagrationi Dynasty, was a king of Kakheti in eastern Georgia from 1709 to 1722. Although a Muslim and a loyal vassal of the Safavid dynasty of Iran, he failed to ensure his kingdom’s security and most of his reign was marked by razzias (called Lekianoba) - incessant inroads by the Dagestani mountainous clansmen.

Biography
David was a son of King Erekle I of Kakheti and Queen Anna née Cholokashvili. He was born and raised at the shah’s court at Isfahan and installed as wali (viceroy) of Kakheti upon his father’s retirement to Iran in 1703. David resided at Qara Aghach or Qaraghaji in eastern Kakheti, on the borders of Shirvan, but had to move his residence to Telavi after he failed to recover Balakan from the Lesgians of Char and lost Qakh to them in 1706. After the death of his father in 1709, Erekle was ordered to Isfahan to receive investiture from Shah Husayn, leaving his younger brother Teimuraz and mother Anna in charge of the government. The years of his obliged absence at the Shah’s court (1711–15), were troubled by the Dagestan attacks and peasant revolts. Returning to Kakheti, David attempted to bring the situation under control. He made an alliance with Jesse, ruler of the neighboring Georgian kingdom of Kartli, and marched against Dagestan, but he suffered defeat and failed to prevent settlements of the Lesgians in the Kakhetian borderlands. In December 1719, he met Vakhtang VI of Kartli and negotiated a new alliance against the Dagestani clans. Early in 1720, reinforcements sent by Vakhtang under the command of Prince Erasti Kaplanishvili arrived in Kakheti, but David refrained from another expedition and sent the Kartlian army back home.

David died at his summer residence at Magharo in 1722 and was buried at Qum, Iran.

Family
David was married twice. His first wife was a daughter of the shamkhal of Tarki; the second one was Yatri Jahan-Begum, daughter of Shakhrukh-Zadeh, beylerbey of Erivan. All his children were by the second marriage: 

Levan (Mahmud Reza Mirza) (died 1734), governor of Ganja for the Shah of Iran. He was killed in battle with the Ottoman Topal Osman Pasha. He had three sons: Asan Mirza, Ivane, and Rostom-Mirza.
Alexander (Nazar 'Ali Mirza) (died 1737), governor of Tiflis during the absence of King Teimuraz II from 1736 to 1738.
Hasan-Mirza (died 1750), Georgian envoy to Nader Shah in 1734.

References

Sources
Mikaberidze, Alexander (ed., 2007). David II (Imam Quli Khan). Dictionary of Georgian National Biography. Accessed October 9, 2007.
 
 დავით II (კახეთის მეფე). People.Istoria.Ge. Accessed October 9, 2007.

1679 births
1722 deaths
Bagrationi dynasty of the Kingdom of Kakheti
Safavid appointed kings of Kakheti
Shia Muslims from Georgia (country)
Iranian people of Georgian descent
People from Isfahan
Burials in Iran
17th-century people of Safavid Iran
18th-century people of Safavid Iran